Reduced to Ashes (2006) is an album by Greek metal band Memorain.

Track listing

All songs written by Ilias Papadakis

"The Land Of Pain"
"The Evil Within"
"Blinded By The Lights"
"Charge"
"See / Hate"
"Reduced To Ashes"
"TV War"
"Facing My Demons"
"Inside My Sickness"
"Against My Fate"
"Nothing Is Left"
"The Lights Into The Night"

Personnel
Ilias Papadakis     - Guitars, Vocals  
Alex Doutsis     - Guitars  
Kostas Bagiatis - Bass  
Nick Menza    - Drums

Guests
Jeff Waters - Solo on track 7

References

2006 albums
EMI Records albums
Memorain albums